De Soto National Memorial is a national memorial (and national park) located in Manatee County, approximately  west of Bradenton, Florida. The national memorial commemorates the 1539 landing of Hernando de Soto and the first extensive organized exploration by Europeans of what is now the southern United States. The memorial site comprises , where the Manatee River joins Tampa Bay. It has  of coastline; eighty percent of the area is mangrove swamp.

De Soto expedition
 
In May 1539, Hernando de Soto and an army of over 600 soldiers landed in the Tampa Bay area. They arrived in nine ships laden with supplies: two hundred and twenty horses, a herd of pigs, war dogs, cannon, matchlock muskets, armor, tools, and rations. They were executing the order of King Charles V to sail to La Florida and "conquer, populate, and pacify" the land.

The expedition did not yield the gold and treasure these men sought. Instead, they marched from one village to the next, taking food and enslaving the native peoples to use as guides and porters. Hundreds of people died on this calamitous four-year,  journey. The de Soto expedition changed the face of the American Southeast and caused Spain to reevaluate their role in the New World. It was the first-hand accounts of survivors, describing the native cultures and the richness of the land, which became the journey's enduring legacy.

The inventory form of the national park was completed in 1976, as a requirement for its listing in the National Register of Historic Places in 1966. The inventory form notes there is no agreement among historians the memorial was the actual landfall of the De Soto expedition. It is generally accepted that its location, situated at the mouth of the Manatee River, would have been a convenient landing place. De Soto made no reference to the landing point but went on to describe the immediate wooded area as swampy and thick with vast and lofty forests.

Historic recognition
When the National Historic Preservation Act was signed into law on October 15, 1966, the memorial was included on the National Register of Historic Places with the name Shaw's Point Archeological District.

The mission of the De Soto National Memorial is to preserve the controversial story of this exploration and interpret its significance in American history. Visitors can attend living history demonstrations, try on a piece of armor, or walk the nature trail through a Florida coastal landscape similar to the one encountered by conquistadors almost five hundred years ago.

Activities

Exhibits at the visitor center include historic armor, 16th-century weapons, and period artifacts. A theater displays the movie Hernando de Soto in America, about the DeSoto Expedition and the area's Native American population. A bookstore is also available.

During the cooler months, visitors can observe Camp Uzita, a living history camp which runs from December through April. The season ends with a re-enactment of DeSoto's landing on the beaches of Tampa Bay.

Other park activities include nature trails and guided trail walks, fishing, bird watching, and picnicking. Park admission is free.

See also
List of national memorials of the United States
De Soto National Forest, in southern Mississippi
Narváez expedition, the predecessor to De Soto's, having also begun near Tampa Bay on La Florida's west coast 
National Register of Historic Places listings in Manatee County, Florida

References

Further reading
 The National Parks: Index 2001–2003. Washington: U.S. Department of the Interior.

External links

 
 Hernando de Soto Historical Society

Archaeological sites in Florida
National Register of Historic Places in Manatee County, Florida
National Memorials of the United States
Spanish colonization of the Americas
Spanish Florida
Museums in Manatee County, Florida
History museums in Florida
Biographical museums in Florida
Native American museums in Florida
Protected areas established in 1948
National Park Service areas in Florida
Monuments and memorials in Florida
Parks in Manatee County, Florida
Florida Native American Heritage Trail
Monuments and memorials on the National Register of Historic Places in Florida